The Bug Star, more formerly known as the Bug Star of the Schutztruppe Bug was a paramilitary award of the German Freikorps which was issued in the 1920s.  Awarded under the authority of local Freikorps commander Major Kobe von Keppenfels, the Bug Star recognized various achievements to members of the local Freikorps.  The Freikorps itself was composed mostly of World War I veterans who had served in the Kurland and Lithuania.

References
 Lumsden, R. (2001), Medals and Decorations of Hitler's Germany (Shrewsbury, MBI Publishing)

External links
 Bug Star description (in German)

Military awards and decorations of Germany